The tenth edition of the Johan Cruyff Shield was held on 5 August 2005 between the 2004–05 Eredivisie and 2004–05 KNVB Cup winners PSV Eindhoven, and Eredivisie runners-up Ajax. Ajax won the match 2–1.

Match details

 

2005
Johan Cruijff-schaal
j
j
Johan Cruyff Shield